Andreas Bonnevie (6 March 1782 – 10 April 1833) was a Norwegian priest and politician.

He was born in Mandal as the son of physician Honoratus Bonnevie and his second wife Kathrine Tørrisdatter. His grandfather had migrated to Norway from Antibes, France.

After private tutoring by bishop Christian Sørensen and attending school in Christianssand, he enrolled at the University of Copenhagen in 1797, graduating with the cand.theol. degree in 1804. He was appointed as vicar in Kalundborg in 1814, but after the events of Norway in 1814 he returned home and became vicar in Kongsberg instead. He was staunchly anti-Swedish, and regretted that Norway drifted from Denmark politically. He was elected to the Norwegian Parliament in 1815, representing his city, but served only one term. From 1824 to his death he served as vicar in Øyestad. He also published a number of poems.

From 1815 to his death, Bonnevie was married to Marie Berg.

References

1782 births
1833 deaths
Norwegian priest-politicians
Members of the Storting
Buskerud politicians
Norwegian male poets
People from Mandal, Norway
Clergy from Kongsberg
Norwegian expatriates in Denmark
Norwegian people of French descent
Bonnevie family